Local elections were held on October 14–15 and 28–29, 2017, in the Republic of Macedonia to elect mayors and members of municipality councils of the 80 municipalities in Macedonia. These were the sixth local elections since the independence of Macedonia.

The mandates of the current mayors and municipality councils ran out on May 22, and unlike those of government ministers, they are not automatically prolonged until new ones are elected. The delay in this respect prevented institutions under municipal authority, such as schools, kindergartens, public enterprises, fire-fighting units, to execute their duties. The new parliamentary majority extended the mandate of the local councils and mayors until new election are held.

On June 3 the newly established government set October 15, 2017 as the date of the upcoming local elections. On August 6, Macedonian parliament speaker Talat Xhaferi announced that local elections would be held October 15, 2017.

The local elections were held as scheduled, on October 15, 2017. The election started in 7AM (local time) and the process was held in relatively peaceful mood, with several minor incidents throughout the country. The polling stations were closed 12 hours later. However, only 45 municipalities elected a mayor in the first round, and 35 had to vote again on October 29.

The second round of the local elections was held as scheduled, October 29, 2017. The election started in 7AM (local time) and the process was held in relatively peaceful mood, with several minor incidents throughout the country. The polling stations were closed 12 hours later.

In both of the first two rounds, voting was held a day early (October 14 and 28) for hospitalized and disadvantaged persons, and those in home detention or prison. A third round re-vote was held on November 12 in the municipality of Čair only.

Results

Incidents and reactions
Alit Abazi, an independent candidate for the council of Kičevo Municipality, was killed in public with a hand gun, but the Ministry of Internal Affairs issued a statement that the murder was not politically motivated. The house of Vlado Misajlovski, a candidate for mayor in Gjorche Petrov, and the bakery of his father caught fire. Police statement said the bakery caught fire because of defective installation and the fire spread to the house. Elvis Bajram, a candidate for mayor in Shuto Orizari, was attacked with a metal pipe after arguing with activists of the opposing candidate. An NGO activist from Struga was beaten after speaking against Ziadin Sela, leader of the Alliance for the Albanians. Voters were caught trying to photograph the ballot and were immediately arrested. People were also arrested for inciting and participating in physical showdowns. Polling stations were briefly closed until the situations were sorted out.

The leading opposition party, VMRO-DPMNE filed dozens of complaints all of which were rejected by the State Election Commission. The leader of the party, former prime-minister Nikola Gruevski, said that he does not recognize the election as free and democratic and asked for an early parliamentary election. After losing in Struga, the city's former mayor Sela said that he does not recognize the result and called DUI to a showdown at an early parliamentary election. The Besa Movement reported that irregularities were noted and complaints were filed.

References

2017 elections in Europe
2017 in the Republic of Macedonia
October 2017 events in Europe
2017